Genetic variability is either the presence of, or the generation of, genetic differences.
It is defined as "the formation of individuals differing in genotype, or the presence of genotypically different individuals, in contrast to environmentally induced differences which, as a rule, cause only temporary, nonheritable changes of the phenotype". Genetic variability in a population is important for biodiversity.

Causes
There are many sources of genetic variability in a population:
Homologous recombination is a significant source of variability. During meiosis in sexual organisms, two homologous chromosomes cross over one another and exchange genetic material.   The chromosomes then split apart and are ready to contribute to forming an offspring. Recombination is random and is governed by its own set of genes.  Being controlled by genes means that recombination is variable in frequency.
Immigration, emigration, and translocation – each of these is the movement of an individual into or out of a population.  When an individual comes from a previously genetically isolated population into a new one it will increase the genetic variability of the next generation if it reproduces.
Polyploidy – having more than two homologous chromosomes allows for even more recombination during meiosis allowing for even more genetic variability in one's offspring.
Diffuse centromeres – in asexual organisms where the offspring is an exact genetic copy of the parent, there are limited sources of genetic variability.  One thing that increased variability, however, is having diffused instead of localized centromeres.  Being diffused allows the chromatids to split apart in many different ways allowing for chromosome fragmentation and polyploidy creating more variability.
Genetic mutations – contribute to the genetic variability within a population and can have positive, negative, or neutral effects on a fitness.  This variability can be easily propagated throughout a population by natural selection if the mutation increases the affected individual's fitness and its effects will be minimized/hidden if the mutation is deleterious.  However, the smaller a population and its genetic variability are, the more likely the recessive/hidden deleterious mutations will show up causing genetic drift.

DNA damages are very frequent, occurring on average more than 60,000 times a day per cell in humans due to metabolic or hydrolytic processes as summarized in DNA damage (naturally occurring).  Most DNA damages are accurately repaired by various DNA repair mechanisms.  However, some DNA damages remain and give rise to mutations.

It appears that most spontaneously arising mutations result from error prone replication (trans-lesion synthesis) past a DNA damage in the template strand.  For example, in yeast more than 60% of spontaneous single-base pair substitutions and deletions are likely caused by translesion synthesis.  Another significant source of mutation is an inaccurate DNA repair process, non-homologous end joining, that is often employed in repair of DNA double-strand breaks. (Also see Mutation.)  Thus it seems that DNA damages are the underlying cause of most spontaneous mutations, either because of error-prone replication past damages or error-prone repair of damages.

Factors that decrease genetic variability
There are many sources that decrease genetic variability in a population:
 Habitat loss, including:
Habitat fragmentation produces discontinuity in an organism's habitat, so that interbreeding is limited. Fragmentation can be caused by many factors, including geological processes or a human-caused events. Fragmentation may further allow genetic drift to lower local genetic diversity.
Climate change is a drastic and enduring change in weather patterns. By driving species out of their fundamental niche, climate change can lower population size and consequently lower genetic variation.
The founder effect, which occurs when a population is founded by few individuals.

See also
 Evolvability
 Human genetic variation
 Personalized medicine

References

Population genetics